Vtoraya Kamenka is a rural locality (a selo) and the administrative center of Vtorokamensky Selsoviet, Loktevsky District, Altai Krai, Russia. The population was 707 as of 2013. There are 6 streets.

Geography 
Vtoraya Kamenka is located on the Kamenka River, 27 km northeast of Gornyak (the district's administrative centre) by road. Mezhdurechye is the nearest rural locality.

References 

Rural localities in Loktevsky District